The 2010 Eurocup Mégane Trophy season was the sixth Eurocup Mégane Trophy season. The season began at Circuit de Spa-Francorchamps on 1 May and finished at the Circuit de Catalunya on 10 October, after seven rounds and fourteen scheduled races. The races tally was reduced to thirteen, after the opening race of the championship was cancelled due to technical problems at Spa-Francorchamps, and was not rescheduled.

Eleven top-two finishes – including seven victories – from the thirteen races gave TDS Racing's Nick Catsburg the championship title, for the team's second drivers' championship crown in three seasons. Team-mate and twice race winner Pierre Thiriet finished 27 points behind Catsburg in second place, and Stefano Comini, a three-time winner, finished third in the standings. Dimitri Enjalbert was the other race winner, as he struggled to match his race-winning form of 2009, when he won seven times. As well as the drivers' championship, TDS Racing claimed the teams' championship due to the strong showings of Catsburg and Thiriet; the team scored almost double the points tally of runners-up Oregon Team, while third TDS driver Jean-Philippe Madonia won the championship for gentlemen drivers for the third successive season.

Teams and drivers

Calendar
 The 2010 calendar was announced on 25 October 2009.

Championship standings

References

External links
The Eurocup Mégane Trophy website

Eurocup Mégane Trophy seasons
Eurocup Megane Trophy
Eurocup Megane Trophy